Benefactor is the second studio album by American new wave band Romeo Void, released in 1982. It was released on CD in 2006 by Wounded Bird Records, with their Never Say Never EP as four bonus tracks. The version of the song "Never Say Never" is a shorter, "clean" edit suitable for general radio broadcast.

Track listing
All songs written by Benjamin Bossi, Larry Carter, Debora Iyall, Peter Woods, and Frank Zincavage, except where noted.
 "Never Say Never" – 3:27
 "Wrap It Up" (Isaac Hayes, David Porter) – 3:15
 "Flashflood" – 4:55
 "Undercover Kept" – 6:05
 "Ventilation" – 3:55
 "Chinatown" – 3:18
 "Orange" – 4:15
 "Shake the Hands of Time" – 3:19
 "S.O.S." – 5:30

Bonus tracks (2006 reissue; taken from "Never Say Never EP")
 "Never Say Never" – 6:06
 "In the Dark" – 4:33
 "Present Tense" – 5:47
 "Not Safe" – 3:57

Personnel 
Debora Iyall – vocals
Peter Woods – guitar
Benjamin Bossi – saxophone
Frank Zincavage – bass
Larry Carter – drums, percussion

Additional personnel
Walter Turbitt – guitar on 9
Marybeth O'Hara – backing vocals on 7
Norman Salant – saxophone on 7

Charts
Album

References 

Romeo Void albums
Albums produced by Ric Ocasek
1982 albums
Columbia Records albums